Ruprecht 44 is an open cluster in the Milky Way galaxy. It is about 6,600 pc away in the constellation Puppis. Ruprecht 44 is a very young open cluster, only about several million years old.

References 

Open clusters
Puppis
Star-forming regions